Synaphe amuralis is a species of moth of the family Pyralidae. It was described by George Hampson in 1900. It is found in Russia.

References

Moths described in 1900
Pyralini